Edward Johnson (12 November 1901 – 21 April 1970) was an Australian rules footballer who played with South Melbourne in the VFL during the 1920s. He was a key position forward and represented Victoria at interstate football.

Football
From his debut in 1923 he topped the club's goalkicking for six successive seasons. From 1924 to 1928 he kicked 50 goals in a season with the exception of 1926 when he kicked 45 goals. His best tally in those years was 60 goals and he achieved that three times without being able to go over.

Place-kicks
Johnson favoured punting over place-kicking, after infamously kicking only two goals from 14 place kicks in the match, against Melbourne, at the Melbourne Cricket Ground, on 24 May 1924.

References

External links

1901 births
1970 deaths
Australian rules footballers from Victoria (Australia)
Australian Rules footballers: place kick exponents
Sydney Swans players
Sandringham Football Club players
Leopold Football Club (MJFA) players